Encantadia is a Philippine television drama fantasy series, the series was a reboot (often called as requel or retelling-sequel) in 2005 fantasy series with the same name. The series premiered on GMA Network's GMA Telebabad evening block and also aired worldwide through GMA Pinoy TV on July 18, 2016, replacing Poor Señorita. and has catch-up episodes via iflix.

The cast including those who will portray the sang'gres or keepers of the four gems were revealed on April 4, 2016. Kylie Padilla played the role of Amihan, Alena by Gabbi Garcia, Danaya by Sanya Lopez and Pirena by Glaiza de Castro.

Urban Luzon and NUTAM (Nationwide Urban Television Audience Measurement) ratings are provided by AGB Nielsen Philippines while Kantar Media Philippines provide Nationwide ratings (Urban + Rural).

The series ended its 44-week run on May 19, 2017, with a total of 218 episodes. It was replaced by Mulawin vs. Ravena. It will reprise a new season with different ambience and will air before the end of the decade.

Series overview

Episodes
The episode titles are taken from the official hashtag of the day, for one episode may have multiple chapters or a continuation of a particular chapter.

The 45th episode marked the end of the retelling of the original story in 2005 wherein Queen Amihan was dethroned by Pirena who headed a coup de etat against the Lireo Kingdom. The 46th episode embarked the beginning of the sequel in which new story line debut.

Season 1 (2016–17)

July 2016

August 2016

September 2016

October 2016

November 2016

December 2016

January 2017

February 2017

March 2017

April 2017

May 2017

References

External links
 Encantadia (2016) official website
 Encantadia (2016) Episode List at IMDb

2016 Episodes
Lists of fantasy television series episodes
Lists of Philippine drama television series episodes